Mark Abbott (born 20 February 1991) is a New Zealand-born Japanese rugby union player who currently plays as a lock for Coca-Cola Red Sparks in Japan's Top League.

Early career

Born in Christchurch and raised in the small town of Darfield, Abbott was educated at St. Andrew's College in his place of birth.   After completing high school, he began studying towards a bachelor of commerce degree at the University of Canterbury while also making his way through the youth structures with national provincial championship side, .   A lack of playing opportunities with Canterbury meant that after graduating university, he headed north to Napier to try and earn a contract with local provincial side,  in 2013.

Senior career

Unfortunately for the Magpies, their stay in New Zealand's top flight was to last only one season as they ended up in last place on the Mitre 10 Cup Premiership log after recording just 2 wins from 10 games.   Abbott's long time second row partner Allardice missed the entire campaign through injury, but in conjunction with up-and-coming youngster Geoffrey Cridge he turned in some good performances in trying circumstances, scoring 2 tries in 10 games.

Super Rugby

Just one season of provincial rugby with Hawke's Bay was all it took to bring Abbott to the attention of New Zealand's Super Rugby franchises and he opted to sign for the Wellington-based  ahead of the 2014 Super Rugby season.   As a result of his lack of top level experience and the 'Canes having locks such as Jeremy Thrush, James Broadhurst and Blade Thomson on their books, Abbott was restricted to just 2 appearances in his first season of Super Rugby.

2015 saw him feature far more regularly, playing 16 times with the majority of his game time coming from the replacements bench as Broadhurst and Thrush once again owned the starting berths. Abbott played 14 of their 18 games during the year, making just 5 starts as newcomers Vaea Fifita and Michael Fatialofa overtook him in the queue for starting positions.

Career honours

Hurricanes

Super Rugby - 2016

Hawke's Bay Magpies

ITM Cup Championship - 2015

Super Rugby statistics

MC
 Television 
 2022 : Fairtex Fight มวยมันพันธุ์ EXTREME (Produced By Tero Entertainment, Fairtex, Lumpinee Boxing Stadium) (Original Name : Lumpinee Fairtex Fight) Live every Saturday from 10:00 a.m.-12:00 p.m. (Originally every Sunday from 18:00-20:00) On Air 7HD35, YouTube:TERO DIGITAL, YouTube:Fairtex Training Center, YouTube:สนามมวย เวทีลุมพินี Starting Saturday, March 5, 2022 - present (Originally Sunday, January 16 - February 13, 2022)

References

1991 births
Living people
New Zealand rugby union players
Rugby union locks
Hawke's Bay rugby union players
Hurricanes (rugby union) players
Rugby union players from Christchurch
People educated at St Andrew's College, Christchurch
Sunwolves players
Coca-Cola Red Sparks players
Munakata Sanix Blues players
Saitama Wild Knights players
New Zealand television presenters